Mono is a moribund Mbum language spoken by older adults in northern Cameroon.

Dama, a closely related variety that may have been a dialect of Mono, is already extinct. It was located in the arrondissement of Rey Bouba (Mayo-Rey department, North Region).

Distribution
Mono is spoken north of Rey Bouba, around Kongrong, and along the Mayo-Godi River (Rey Bouba commune, Mayo-Rey department, Northern Region).

Spoken by 1,100 speakers, Mono is in decline as speakers are shifting to Fulfulde.

References

Blench, Roger and Stefan Elders. A wordlist of Mono, a highly endangered Adamawa language of Cameroun.

Languages of Cameroon
Mbum languages